Aşıqbayramlı (also, Ashygbayramly and Ashykhbayramly) is a village and municipality in the Ismailli Rayon of Azerbaijan.  It has a population of 765.

References 

Populated places in Ismayilli District